Ross Campbell (born 3 July 1987) is a Scottish former professional footballer. Campbell started his career with Scottish Premier League club Hibernian and represented Scotland at the under–20 and under–21 levels. He went on to play for Swedish club Ostersunds FK, Dunfermline Athletic and Dumbarton.

Career
Campbell was born in Edinburgh and grew up in Innerleithen in the Scottish Borders. He attended Peebles High School before signing for Hibernian. He broke into the Hibs first team under the management of John Collins and he made his debut on 15 January 2007 in a 2–0 victory against Kilmarnock. Campbell was loaned out for a month to Dunfermline Athletic in September 2008. He returned to Easter Road having scored one goal in three substitute appearances for Dunfermline.

Campbell signed for Swedish club Ostersunds FK after he was told by manager John Hughes that he was free to leave Hibs, even though he still had a year remaining of his contract. He left the club in 2010, and joined Grimsby Town on trial.

Campbell joined Dunfermline Athletic in February 2010 until the end of the season. After leaving the Pars at the end of the 2009/10 season, Campbell signed for Dumbarton.

International
Campbell earned international recognition for Scotland under–20s against Canada under–20s on 27 March 2007, scoring both goals in a 2–1 victory. Campbell was subsequently selected for the 2007 Under-20 World Cup in Canada. He scored the only goal for Scotland in a 3–1 loss to Japan under–20s in Victoria, British Columbia.

References

External links
 
 Profile at dafc.co.uk

1987 births
Living people
Footballers from Edinburgh
Scottish footballers
Scotland youth international footballers
Scotland under-21 international footballers
Scottish expatriate footballers
Association football forwards
Hibernian F.C. players
Dunfermline Athletic F.C. players
Dumbarton F.C. players
Scottish Premier League players
Scottish Football League players
Expatriate footballers in Sweden
Scottish expatriate sportspeople in Sweden
Östersunds FK players